Lantz Hall is a historic building located at Massanutten Military Academy, Woodstock, Shenandoah County, Virginia. It was built in 1907–1909, and is a 3 1/2-story, seven bay by three bay, brick faced frame building in the Late Gothic Revival style.  It features a projecting Gothic tower pavilion and three-bay pointed-arched porch.  In 1926, a three-story, seven-by-three bay, gable-roofed ell was constructed to the rear.  The building houses a dormitory, classrooms, a gymnasium/firing range, and an auditorium.  It was the second building built on the Massanutten Military Academy campus.

It was listed on the National Register of Historic Places in 1992.

References

School buildings on the National Register of Historic Places in Virginia
Gothic Revival architecture in Virginia
School buildings completed in 1909
Schools in Shenandoah County, Virginia
National Register of Historic Places in Shenandoah County, Virginia
1909 establishments in Virginia